Joseph Lucas (1879 – 16 September 1973) was a Trinidadian cricketer. He played in nine first-class matches for Trinidad and Tobago from 1898 to 1904.

See also
 List of Trinidadian representative cricketers

References

External links
 

1879 births
1973 deaths
Trinidad and Tobago cricketers